Union Sportive Olympique Nivernaise is a French rugby union club from Nevers, currently playing in the second level of the country's professional rugby system, Pro D2.

History

The team origins dates back to 1 August 1903, when Gustave Bossut created the PAG (Peloton d’avant-garde). This quickly became USN (Union sportive nivernaise) and then USON (Union sportive olympique nivernaise) in 1956. The name was changed to USON Nevers Rugby in 2016 to mark a new step in the club's history.

After finishing 3rd at the end of the 2016–17 Fédérale 1 season, they won promotion to the second tier of French rugby after coming back to beat SO Chambéry in the second round of their promotion play-offs. For the first time in their history, they will compete in the Rugby Pro D2 starting from the 2017–18 season.

The team plays in yellow and blue shirts and play their come matches at the 7,500 -capacity Stade du Pré Fleuri in Nevers.

Current standings

Current squad

The USON Nevers squad for the 2022–23 season is:

4

Espoirs squad

See also

 List of rugby union clubs in France

References

External links
 Official website

French rugby union clubs
Sport in Nièvre
Nevers
Rugby clubs established in 1903
1903 establishments in France